Mauro Simonetti (14 July 1948) was an Italian professional road bicycle racer. As an amateur he won a bronze medal in the team road race at the 1968 Olympics. After that he rode professionally between 1970 and 1979.

Major results

1970
Gran Premio Città di Camaiore
1971
Tour de France:
Winner stage 6B
1972
Coppa Ugo Agostoni
1973
Coppa Sabatini
1974
San Michele – Agliana

See also
Italian medals in cycling at the Olympic Games
Italy at the 1968 Summer Olympics

References

External links 

Official Tour de France results for Mauro Simonetti
Report on Italian Olympic cyclists 

1948 births
1986 deaths
Italian male cyclists
Italian Tour de France stage winners
Cyclists at the 1968 Summer Olympics
Olympic bronze medalists for Italy
Olympic cyclists of Italy
Sportspeople from Livorno
Olympic medalists in cycling
Medalists at the 1968 Summer Olympics
Cyclists from Tuscany